Lena (Asturian: Ḷḷena ) is a municipality in the Autonomous Community of the Principality of Asturias, Spain. It has a population of 12.000 inhabitants, while 9,200 of them live in the capital, Pola de Lena.

Parishes

Main sights
Pre-Romanesque church of Santa Cristina de Lena. In 1985 it was included in the UNESCO World Heritage List.
Mosaic of Vega de Ciego, discovered in 1921. It was probably from a Roman villa, and is now in the Archaeological Museum of Asturias
El Hospitalón (16th century)
Baroque Palacio de Faes, at Carabanzo

References

Municipalities in Asturias